Charlotte De Vos Meerbergen (born 8 October 1983) is a Belgian field hockey player. She played in the Dutch League for Oranje Zwart in Eindhoven as an attacker and was a captain of the Belgium women's national field hockey team until 2014.  At the 2012 Summer Olympics she competed with the Belgium women's national field hockey team in the women's tournament.

De Vos began her career at Royal Victory HC. She played in the Netherlands since 2008, in the 2008/09 season at MHC Laren then played for Oranje Zwart. In 2014, she decided to return to Royal Victory HC. Beside hockey, she is also co-owner of Twizzit, an online platform for sportclubs.

On 23 June 2015, she married Paul Meerbergen in the presence of her two maids of honour, Caroline De Vos and Sofie Christiaens.

References

External links 

 

Living people
1983 births
Field hockey players at the 2012 Summer Olympics
Olympic field hockey players of Belgium
Belgian female field hockey players
Sportspeople from Antwerp